Djibouti is a 2021 Indian Malayalam-language action thriller film co-written and directed by S. J. Sinu (in his directorial debut). The film stars Amith Chakalakkal, Shagun Jaswal, Dileesh Pothan, Jacob Gregory, Biju Sopanam, and Anjali Nair. The film was produced by Jobi P. Sam under the company Blue Hill Nael Communications and Nile & Blue Hill Motion Pictures. The film was released in theatres on 31 December 2021.

Plot 

Hannah, a Djiboutian girl visits Kerala. She becomes friends with Louie and Aby who are living in Idukki district of Kerala. She arranges job for her friends in Djibouti, an African country. The problems faced by them there and how they plan to escape to their hometown becomes the premise of the movie.

Cast 
 Amith Chakalakkal as Louie
 Shagun Jaswal as Hannah
 Jacob Gregory as Aby
 Dileesh Pothan 
 Geetha as Loui's Mother
 Anjali Nair 
 Athira Harikumar
  Kishore
 Rohit Maggu
 Biju Sopanam
 Pauly Valsan
 Sunil Sukhada
 Alancier Ley Lopez
 Naseer Sankranthi
 Vettukili Prakash
 Sminu Sijo
 Jayasree Sivadas

Production 
The film was announced in January 2020. The first schedule of the shooting started in Idukki district, Kerala in February 2020. After the first schedule, a team of seventy five members went to Djibouti for the second schedule shooting during first week of March 2020. After that many countries announced lockdown due to COVID-19 pandemic. The crew still continued the shooting by isolating themselves in Tadjoura, an old city in Djibouti as there was no covid threat in that area. At that time Djibouti was the only Malayalam film in production as all other shooting were banned due to COVID-19 lockdown. They finished their second schedule on 19 April 2020, but was unable to return as the airport in that area was closed due to the lockdown announced on 16 March 2020. For about one month the team stayed in a villa complex in the city and after that they sought for help to bring them back. By the help of the Indian Embassy and the producer, the team returned to Kerala in a private flight on 5 June 2020. The crew had planned another schedule in China which was cancelled and the shooting was completed in 2020.

The teaser of the film was released by the prime minister of Djibouti, Abdoulkader Kamil Mohamed on 25 March 2021. The music launch of the film was conducted in Kochi in April 2021. Prithviraj Sukumaran, Dulquer Salman, Jayasurya and Fahad Fasil released the trailer of the movie in August 2021, through their social media accounts.

Music 
Deepak Dev composed the songs and background scores for the film. Kaithapram Damodaran Namboothiri and Vinayak Sasikumar are the lyricists for the songs.

Release
Djibouti was released in theatres on 31 December 2021. The film was originally scheduled to release on 10 December 2021. Produced in Malayalam, the film is dubbed in Tamil, Telugu, Hindi, Kannada, and French.

References

External links 

Indian action thriller films
2021 films
2021 action thriller films
2020s Malayalam-language films
Film productions suspended due to the COVID-19 pandemic
Films postponed due to the COVID-19 pandemic